The Ausar Auset Society is a Pan-African spiritual  organization founded in 1973 by Ra Un Nefer Amen.

It is based in Brooklyn, New York, with chapters in several major cities in the United States as well as international chapters in London, England, Toronto, Canada, Bermuda and Trinidad & Tobago. The organization provides afrocentric-based spiritual training to the African American community in particular and to the African diaspora in general.

Organizational structure
Each Ausar Auset Society branch or study group replicates the society's structure established by Ra Un Nefer Amen in New York and falls under the leadership of either a Paramount King, Paramount Queen Mother, or Chief(tess) who has their own hierarchy of officials and autonomy over their respective region.

Some publications
Amen, Ra Un Nefer, Harlem River Arrangement: The I Ching Transcripts, 1984
Amen, Ra Un Nefer, Metu Neter Vol. 1, 1990
Amen, Ra Un Nefer, Ma'at, The 11 Laws of God, 2003
Amen, Ra Un Nefer, Meditation Fundamentals Software, 2007
Amen, Ra Un Nefer, Nuk Au Neter: The Kamitic Holy Scriptures, 2008
Living Legacy DVD: The History of the Ausar Auset Society, 2009

References

External links
AAS International New York
BlogTalkRadio Show

African-American organizations
African and Black nationalist organizations in North America
Modern pagan organizations based in the United States
Modern pagan organizations established in 1973
Pan-Africanism in the United States
Pan-Africanist organizations
New religious movements
1973 establishments in New York (state)
Religious belief systems founded in the United States